is a 1950 black-and-white Japanese film directed by Torajiro Saito.

Cast
 Haruo Oka
 Hibari Misora
 Sanae Ijita (柴田早苗)
 Mitsuko Yoshikawa
 Tamae Kiyokawa (清川玉枝)
 Achako Hanabishi (花菱アチャコ)
 Shintarō Kido
 Robba Furukawa (古川緑波/古川ロッパ)

See also
 List of films in the public domain in the United States

References

Japanese black-and-white films
1950 films
Films directed by Torajiro Saito
Shintoho films
1950s Japanese films